Reinhold Tiling (13 June 1893 – 11 October 1933) was a German engineer, pilot and a rocket pioneer.

Biography
Tiling was born in Absberg, Kingdom of Bavaria, as the son of a pastor. Shortly after he began the study of mechanical engineering and electro-technology he found himself in war service at the beginning of the First World War. In 1915 he volunteered as a fighter pilot in the newly created German Luftstreitkräfte.

In 1926 Tiling became flight controller of Osnabrück airport. He began to explore rocket technology during this period, probably inspired by Hermann Oberth's book "Die Rakete zu den Planetenräumen" (By Rocket into Planetary Space); he started his first experiments in 1928.

Tiling developed re-usable rocket planes which start as a rocket and land with swinging-out wings. This principle was similarly used by NASA for flights of the Space Shuttle. His innovation also allowed him to develop rockets which had the necessary thrust and burning duration for flight.

In 1929 Gisbert Freiherr von Ledebur (1899–1980) allowed Tiling the use of a workshop in Ahrenshorst. In June 1929 some successful demonstrations were completed during which missiles reached a height of 1,000 metres.

On 13 March 1931 Tiling and his co-worker Karl Poggensee succeeded in the launch of a solid-propellant rocket. The rocket flew for 11 seconds and reached a height of 1,800 metres. Further rocket launches were undertaken in the following weeks.

The break-through experiment occurred on 15 April 1931, when Tiling demonstrated a post office rocket which carried 188 postcards reliably. Further tests showed the efficiency and reliability of his rockets. The rockets became famous in Germany and attracted large public interest. This also attracted the attention of the Reichsmarine who had been developing rockets for military use since 1929.

Despite the support of friends and sponsors, Tiling's work was beset by financial difficulties. On 10 October 1933, the overheating of the powder needed to power the rocket created an explosion in Tiling's workshop in Ahrenshorst; Tiling, his assistant Angela Buddenboehmer, and his mechanic Friedrich Kuhr suffered heavy burns. They succumbed to these injuries on the following day with Tiling dying in Osnabrück.

A crater on the backside of the moon is named after Reinhold Tiling, located at coordinates 53° 06' S
132° 36' W.

See also
Rocket mail
9783862251063 ISBN Reinhold Tiling : ǂb Flieger und Forscher, Erfinder der Kammerrakete / ǂc Klaus Tiling, Martin Frauenheim.

External links
Reinhold Tiling – Pionier der Raketentechnik (German)

1893 births
1933 deaths
German World War I pilots
Engineers from Bavaria
Luftstreitkräfte personnel
People from the Kingdom of Bavaria
German rocket scientists
German spaceflight pioneers
Aerobatic pilots
People from Weißenburg-Gunzenhausen
Deaths from laboratory accidents